PRQ may stand for:

 PRQ, a Swedish internet service provider
 Ashéninka Perené, the Campa family language of Peru, ISO 639 identifier
 Parti républicain du Québec